Zog Djaloshi (born 23 February 2000) is an Albanian professional footballer who plays as a centre-back for Greek Super League 2 club Apollon Pontus.

References

2000 births
Living people
Albanian footballers
Albanian expatriate footballers
Football League (Greece) players
Super League Greece 2 players
Trikala F.C. players
Apollon Pontou FC players
Albanian expatriate sportspeople in Greece
Expatriate footballers in Greece
Association football defenders